This is a list of people who were murdered in the Sobibor extermination camp. The United States Holocaust Memorial Museum states that at least 170,000 people were murdered there. The Dutch Sobibor Foundation lists a calculated total of 170,165 people and cites the Höfle Telegram among its sources, while noting that other estimates range up to 300,000. For practical reasons it is not possible to list all the people murdered at the camp. The operatives of the Nazi regime not only robbed Jews of their earthly possessions and their lives but attempted to eradicate all traces of their existence as they engaged in the genocidal policies of the Final Solution.

Survivors of Sobibor

There are fifty-eight known survivors; forty-nine male and ten female, among those who were in the camp as Arbeitshäftlinge, deportees selected from arriving transports to perform slave-labour for the daily operation of the camp. Their time in the camp ranged from several weeks to almost two years. A handful of Arbeitshäftlinge managed to escape while assigned to the Waldkommando, inmate details assigned the task of felling and preparing trees for the body disposal pyres. Dutch historian Jules Schelvis estimated that 158 inmates perished in the revolt, killed by the guards and the minefield surrounding the camp, and that a further 107 were re-captured and murdered by the SS, Wehrmacht and Police units tasked with pursuing the escapees. He estimates that another 53 escapees died of other causes between the day of the revolt and May 8, 1945. In the aftermath of the revolt, the remaining camp inmates were murdered and the camp dismantled. Schelvis estimated that at the time of the escape there had been approximately 650 inmates in the camp.

Among the Sobibor survivors are also those who were spared the gas chambers in the camp as a result of transfer to slave-labour camps in the Lublin district, after selections upon arrival at Sobibor. These people spent several hours at Sobibor and were transferred almost immediately to slave-labour camps, including Majdanek and Alter Flugplatz camp in the city of Lublin, where materials looted from the gassed victims were prepared for shipment and distribution, and forced labour camps such as Krychów, Dorohucza and Trawniki. Estimates for the number of people selected in Sobibor range up to several thousand, of whom many perished in captivity before the end of the Nazi regime. The total number of survivors in this cohort includes 16 known survivors, 13 women and 3 men, from among the 34,313 people deported to Sobibor from the Netherlands.

References 

 
Sobibor
Sobibor